Agni-II (IAST: Agni), is the second strategic ballistic missile of Agni (missile) family envisaged to be the mainstay of the Indian missile-based strategic nuclear deterrence. The Agni-II is a medium-range ballistic missile (MRBM) with two solid fuel stages and a Post Boost Vehicle (PBV) integrated into the missile's Re-entry Vehicle (RV). The Agni's manoeuvring RV is made of a carbon-carbon composite material that is light and able to sustain high thermal stresses of re-entry, in a variety of trajectories. The Agni-IIA is a more advanced version of Agni-II, albeit with more sophisticated and lighter materials, yielding a better range and operating regime. Agni-IIA was later renamed as Agni-IV plugging the gap between Agni-II and Agni-III. While the first test of Agni-IV in December 2010 was a failure, the second test flight in November 2011 was a success Agni-II, developed as part of medium- and long-range Agni series of missile systems, has already been inducted into the Armed Forces.

On 17 May 2010, the trial was conducted with a special strategic command force (SSC) of nuclear-capable Agni-II ballistic missile, with a range of 2,000 kilometres from the Wheelers Island off Orissa coast thus making Agni-II missile operational by army. US Air Force National Air and Space Intelligence Center estimating that as of June 2017 less than 10 launchers were operationally deployed, operated by the 335 Missile Group at Secunderabad using 12 TEL vehicles.

Agni-II can reach all of Pakistan and most parts of south and southeastern China.

See also

References

Ballistic missiles of India
Medium-range ballistic missiles
Military equipment introduced in the 2000s